Ivars Peterson (born 4 December 1948) is an American mathematics writer.

Early life 
Peterson received a B.Sc. in Physics and Chemistry and a B.Ed. in Education from the University of Toronto. Peterson received an M.A. in Journalism from the University of Missouri-Columbia.

Career
Peterson worked as a high school science and mathematics teacher.

Peterson has been a columnist and online editor at Science News and Science News for Kids, and has been columnist for the children's magazine Muse. He wrote the weekly online column Ivars Peterson’s MathTrek.  Peterson is the author of a number of popular mathematics and related books. Peterson has been a weekly mathematics columnist for MAA Online.

Peterson received the Joint Policy Board for Mathematics Communications Award in 1991 for "exceptional skill in communicating mathematics to the general public over the last decade".

For the spring 2008 semester, he accepted the Wayne G. Basler Chair of Excellence for the Integration of the Arts, Rhetoric and Science at East Tennessee State University. He gave a four lectures on how math is integral in our society and our universe. He also taught a course entitled "Communicating Mathematics".

In 2007, Peterson was named Director of Publications for Journals and Communications at the Mathematical Association of America.

Bibliography

 Mathematical Treks: From Surreal Numbers to Magic Circles (2002) Mathematical Association of America 
 Fragments of Infinity: A Kaleidoscope of Math and Art (2000) John Wiley & Sons 
 The Jungles of Randomness: A Mathematical Safari (1997) John Wiley & Sons 
 Fatal Defect: Chasing Killer Computer Bugs (1995) Times Books 
Newton's Clock: Chaos in the Solar System (1993) W.H. Freeman 
 Islands of Truth: Mathematical Mystery Cruise (1990) W.H.Freeman 
 The Mathematical Tourist: Snapshots of Modern Mathematics (1988) W.H.Freeman

References

External links
 
 Ivars Peterson homepage - googlepages
 Ivars Peterson The Mathematical Tourist - blogspot 
 Ivars Peterson The Mathematical Tourist - Mathematical Association of America via: archive.org
 Ivars Peterson MathTrek archives  Mathematical Association of America 
 JPBM Communications Award.

Living people
University of Toronto alumni
University of Missouri alumni
Canadian science writers
Mathematics writers
Mathematics popularizers
East Tennessee State University faculty
1948 births
Canadian mathematicians